Julia Collins (born November 10, 1982) is an American game show contestant and a supply chain professional from Wilmette, Illinois.

She is best known for being a 20-day champion on the quiz show Jeopardy!. She had the most consecutive wins of a woman contestant until Amy Schneider surpassed her on December 29, 2021. During her run from April 21 to June 2, 2014, she won $429,100, which at the time was the third and is now the ninth highest total in Jeopardy! history for regular play.

Jeopardy!
Collins began her original run on April 21, 2014.  She won $428,100 over 20 consecutive victories from between April 21 and May 30.  On June 2, her run came to an end as she was defeated by challenger Brian Loughnane.  She finished the game in third place after wagering her entire daily total in Final Jeopardy! and failing to provide a correct response.  Her third place consolation prize of $1,000 was added to her winnings to give her a total of $429,100 – at the time, this was the third highest total earnings in Jeopardy! regular play history, only trailing Ken Jennings and David Madden.  She trailed only Jennings (74) in number of games won and finished just ahead of Madden (19).  She would later be surpassed in both categories by James Holzhauer, who won 32 consecutive games in 2019, and she would also be surpassed by Jason Zuffranieri in the cash category the same year, giving her the third longest winning streak and sixth highest total earnings in Jeopardy! regular play history at the time.  She was surpassed in both categories by Matt Amodio in September 2021, Amy Schneider in December 2021., Mattea Roach in May, 2022, and Cris Pannullo in December, 2022.

Collins was invited to the 2014 Jeopardy! Tournament of Champions, where she finished second in her quarterfinal game against Joshua Brakhage and 2013 College Champion Jim Coury, but reached the semifinals as a wild card. She then won her semifinal game, advancing to the finals, where she finished third, behind winner Ben Ingram and second-place finisher Arthur Chu.

In the 2018 All-Star Games draft show, she still remains friends with Ben Ingram and picked him as her first pick and Seth Wilson for her second pick. In 2019, they finished in third place in the second match against Team Ken and Team Austin and split $50,000.

Personal life
A native of Wilmette, Illinois, Collins graduated from The Madeira School in McLean, Virginia, in 2001. She earned a double-major bachelor's degree in art history and history from Wellesley College in 2005, and a master's degree in logistics and supply chain management engineering from the Massachusetts Institute of Technology in 2010.

References

1982 births
Living people
American television personalities
American women television personalities
Jeopardy! contestants
Madeira School alumni
Wellesley College alumni
Massachusetts Institute of Technology alumni
People from Wilmette, Illinois
Date of birth missing (living people)